The Treo 90 is a Palm OS PDA developed by Handspring. It was released on May 28, 2002. The Treo 90 was the only Treo model produced without an integrated cellular phone. When first released it was the smallest Palm OS device on the market.

Design 
The Treo 90 features a 12-bit standard (160x160) resolution color super-twisted nematic display, LED backlighting, a miniature QWERTY keyboard that replaces the usual Graffiti on other PDAs, an infrared port and an SD card slot.

ROM update
The original Palm OS (4.1H) lacks SDIO support and reportedly has trouble formatting 128 megabyte SanDisk cards. The Treo 90 Updater addresses this problem and adds some other edits. The update is not a software patch but is burned into ROM.

The ROM 4.1H3 update allows the use of SD Cards up to 1GB (confirmed).

Additionally the new SDIO capability allows users to expand the device's features with two expansion cards: the Palm Bluetooth card, which allows the Treo 90 to access the Internet, email and messages wirelessly with a Bluetooth-enabled mobile phone and MARGI Systems Presenter-and-Go which connects the Treo 90 directly to digital LCD projectors or other VGA devices to show business presentations stored on the Treo in full color.

See also
List of Palm OS Devices
Palm Treo
Palm OS

References

External links
Official Palm site

Palm OS devices
68k-based mobile devices